Kadwell is a surname. Notable people with the surname include:

 Harry Kadwell (1902–1999), Australian rugby league footballer
 Jack Kadwell (1918−2007), Australian rugby league footballer

See also
 Cadwell (disambiguation)
 Kadell